Eastern Finland was a province of Finland from 1997 to 2009. It bordered the provinces of Oulu, Western Finland and Southern Finland. It also bordered Russia to the east.

History 

On September 1, 1997, the Mikkeli Province, the Kuopio Province and Northern Karelia Province were joined to form the new Eastern Finland Province.

All the provinces of Finland were abolished on January 1, 2010.

Administration 

The State Provincial Office was a joint regional authority of seven different ministries. It promoted national and regional objectives of the State central administration. Eastern Finland State Provincial Office had branch offices in Mikkeli, Joensuu, and Kuopio.

Regions 

Eastern Finland was divided into three regions:
North Karelia (Pohjois-Karjala / Norra Karelen)
Northern Savonia (Pohjois-Savo / Norra Savolax)
Southern Savonia (Etelä-Savo / Södra Savolax)

Municipalities in 2009 (cities in bold) 
Eastern Finland was divided into 54 municipalities in 2009.

 Enonkoski
 Heinävesi
 Hirvensalmi
 Iisalmi
 Ilomantsi
 Joensuu
 Joroinen
 Juankoski
 Juuka
 Juva
 Kaavi
 Kangasniemi
 Karttula
 Keitele
 Kerimäki
 Kesälahti
 Kitee
 Kiuruvesi
 Kontiolahti
 Kuopio
 Lapinlahti
 Leppävirta
 Lieksa
 Liperi
 Maaninka
 Mikkeli
 Mäntyharju
 Nilsiä
 Nurmes
 Outokumpu
 Pertunmaa
 Pieksämäki
 Pielavesi
 Polvijärvi
 Punkaharju
 Puumala
 Rantasalmi
 Rautalampi
 Rautavaara
 Ristiina
 Rääkkylä
 Savonlinna
 Siilinjärvi
 Sonkajärvi
 Sulkava
 Suonenjoki
 Tervo
 Tohmajärvi
 Tuusniemi
 Valtimo
 Varkaus
 Varpaisjärvi
 Vesanto
 Vieremä

Former municipalities (disestablished before 2009) 

 Anttola
 Eno
 Haukivuori
 Jäppilä
 Kangaslampi
 Kiihtelysvaara
 Mikkelin mlk
 Pieksämäen mlk
 Pieksänmaa
 Pyhäselkä
 Savonranta
 Tuupovaara
 Vehmersalmi
 Virtasalmi
 Värtsilä

Governors 
Pirjo Ala-Kapee 1997–2009

Heraldry 

The coat of arms of Eastern Finland was composed of the arms of Savonia and Karelia.

References

External links 
 Eastern Finland State Provincial Office  - Official site
 Video about travelling in Koli area
 Pielis.ru — По Восточной Финляндии и дальше ...  

 
Provinces of Finland (1997–2009)
States and territories established in 1997
States and territories disestablished in 2009